Alec Thomas Mills (born November 30, 1991) is an American professional baseball pitcher who is a free agent. The Kansas City Royals selected Mills in the 22nd round of the 2012 Major League Baseball draft. He previously played for the Kansas City Royals and Chicago Cubs.

College career
Mills attended Montgomery Central High School in Cunningham, Tennessee. He played college baseball at the University of Tennessee at Martin as a walk-on. Mills played at UT Martin from 2010-12. He developed from a freshman walk-on relief pitcher who went 2-3 with an 8.51 ERA, to a setup reliever as a sophomore who went 7-4 with a 6.82 ERA, and eventually to a starting pitcher during his junior campaign going 4-6 with a 3.94 ERA.
 
In 2011, Mills notched seven victories and three saves while making 30 appearances for a Skyhawk squad that won an OVC Tournament game for the first time. Mills ranks on UT Martin's top-10 career list in appearances (67, sixth), strikeouts (165, seventh) and wins (13, eighth).

Professional career

Kansas City Royals
After his junior year of college, the Kansas City Royals selected Mills in the 22nd round of the 2012 Major League Baseball draft. He signed with the Royals and made his professional debut with the Idaho Falls Chukars, and was 1-4 with a 4.62 ERA. He spent 2013 with the Lexington Legends, 2014 with Idaho Falls and Lexington and 2015 with the Wilmington Blue Rocks. The Royals added him to their 40-man roster after the season.

Mills began the 2016 season with the Northwest Arkansas Naturals of the Class AA Texas League. The Royals promoted Mills to the major leagues on May 18, and he made his major league debut that day. In 2016, in 3.1 innings he gave up five earned runs. On February 8, 2017, Mills was designated for assignment by the Royals.

Chicago Cubs
On February 8, 2017, the Royals traded Mills to the Chicago Cubs for minor leaguer Donnie Dewees. Assigned to the Iowa Cubs of the Class AAA Pacific Coast League, he made seven appearances during the 2017 season, spending much of the year on the disabled list with a left ankle contusion and then a strained right forearm.

After returning to Iowa in 2018, the Cubs promoted Mills to start his first MLB game for injured Tyler Chatwood against the Cincinnati Reds on August 24, 2018. He also got his first hit in the same game. He spent most of 2019 with Iowa, where he was 6-4 with a 5.11 ERA.

Mills joined the Cubs rotation in the 2020 season after José Quintana began the season on the injured list.

On September 13, 2020, Mills no-hit the Milwaukee Brewers 12–0 at Miller Park. He threw 74 of 114 pitches for strikes while striking out five and walking three. It marked the 16th no-hitter in the Cubs franchise history. Mills finished the 2020 season with a 5–5 record and a 4.48 ERA in 11 starts. His home runs per nine innings rate (1.9) was the highest among qualified NL pitchers. Mills made 32 appearances (20 starts) for Chicago in 2021, posting a 6-7 record and 5.07 ERA with 87 strikeouts in 119.0 innings pitched.

On May 19, 2022, Mills was placed on the 60-day injured list with a back injury. After making four rehab starts, he was activated on June 7. He elected free agency on November 10, 2022.

Personal
Mills and his wife, Paige, welcomed their first child, a son, in 2020.

References

External links

Living people
1991 births
People from Clarksville, Tennessee
Baseball players from Tennessee
Major League Baseball pitchers
Kansas City Royals players
Chicago Cubs players
UT Martin Skyhawks baseball players
Idaho Falls Chukars players
Lexington Legends players
Wilmington Blue Rocks players
Northwest Arkansas Naturals players
Omaha Storm Chasers players
Iowa Cubs players
Madison Mallards players